Machine translation is an algorithm which attempts to translate text or speech from one natural language to another.

General information 
Basic general information for popular machine translation applications.

Languages features comparison 

The following table compares the number of languages which the following machine translation programs can translate between.
(Moses and Moses for Mere Mortals allow you to train translation models for any language pair, though collections of translated texts (parallel corpus) need to be provided by the user. The Moses site provides links to training corpora.)

This is not an all-encompassing list. Some applications have many more language pairs than those listed below. This is a general comparison of key languages only. A full and accurate list of language pairs supported by each product should be found on each of the product's websites.

See also 
 Machine translation
 Machine translation software usability
 Computer-assisted translation
 Comparison of computer-assisted translation tools

External links 
 Apertium wiki (list of language pairs and licence information)
 Xerox Easy Translator Service (list of language pairs)
 Bing Translator Language List
 Haitian Creole support in Bing/Microsoft Translator
 Microsoft Research: Syntactically Informed Phrasal SMT
 List of supported languages in Google Translate

References 

Evaluation of machine translation

Natural language processing software
Machine translation applications